Inishbeg or Inish beg (Gaeilge: Inis Beag, 'small island') is a name given to several mostly uninhabited islands in Ireland.

List of islands named Inishbeg
 Inishbeg, County Donegal
 Inishbeg, County Cork
 Inishbeg, County Sligo
 Inis Beag, a pseudonymous island near the Aran Islands described by US cultural anthropologist John Cowan Messenger in several academic texts

Inishbeg, County Cork
Inisheg is a former island now connected to the mainland by a bridge joining the R595 road. It is part of Carbery's Hundred Isles

Demographics

References

Islands of the Republic of Ireland
Broad-concept articles